The 1952–53 Irish Cup was the 73rd edition of the premier knock-out cup competition in Northern Irish football. 

Ards were the holders but they were defeated 5-4 by Glentoran in the quarter-finals.

Linfield won the cup for the 26th time, defeating Coleraine 5–0 in the final at Solitude.

Results

First round

|}

Replay

|}

Second replay

|}

Quarter-finals

|}

Semi-finals

|}

Final

References

External links
The Rec.Sport.Soccer Statistics Foundation - Northern Ireland - Cup Finals

Irish Cup seasons
1952–53 in Northern Ireland association football
1952–53 domestic association football cups